Exposition (also the French for exhibition) may refer to:

Universal exposition or World's Fair
Expository writing
Exposition (narrative)
Exposition (music)
Trade fair
Exposition (album), the debut album by the band Wax on Radio
Expository preaching

See also
Expo (disambiguation)
Expose (disambiguation)
Expos